Marcos & Belutti or Marcos e Belutti is a Brazilian sertanejo duo formed in 2007, made up of Leonardo Prado de Souza, also known as Marcos (born Santo André, on 29 August 1983), and Bruno Belucci Pereira, also known as Belutti (born in São Paulo on 7 November 1981).

Discography

Albums
Studio albums
2010: Nosso Lugar
2012: Cores
2017: Acredite

Live albums
2009: Ao Vivo
2011: Sem Me Controlar - Ao Vivo
2014: Acústico
2015: Acústico Tão Feliz
2018: M&B - 10 Anos
2019: Presente
2020: Cumpra-se

DVDs
2008: Ao Vivo
2011: Sem Me Controlar - Ao Vivo
2014: Acústico
2015: Acústico Tão Feliz
2018: M&B - 10 Anos
2019: Presente

EPs 
2018: 10 Anos

Singles

Promotional singles

References

External links
Official website

Sertanejo music groups
Sertanejo musicians
Brazilian musical duos
Brazilian musical groups
2007 establishments in Brazil